Charles F. Foley (c. 1868-?) was an American lawyer and politician. He began to practice about 1888 at Lyons, Kansas.

He was born and educated in Canada and later on in Boston, Massachusetts. In 1880, at age twenty, he moved to Kansas and, through his work as a school teacher in the eastern section of the state, earned enough to defray his expenses at the University of Kansas. He graduated from the law department in 1884, then continued teaching two years more, and in 1887 began the practice of law at Lyons. Additionally, he served as county attorney for four years.

Foley was a Democrat, a member of the Masonic order and the Knights of Pythias. His public record began with his election to the State Legislature in 1896, and by re-election he served during the session of 1897-98-99.

In 1909, Governor Stubbs appointed him regent of the University of Kansas, and four years later he was reappointed by Governor Hodges and served until July, 1913. On December 8, 1913, he was appointed by Governor Hodges a member of the Public Utilities Commission, and served as its chairman until April 1, 1915. In February, 1915, he had been reappointed by Governor Capper, and on the expiration of his short term in January, 1916, Governor Capper reappointed him for the full term of three years.

Democratic Party members of the Kansas House of Representatives
1860s births
Year of death missing
People from Lyons, Kansas